KZOQ-FM (100.1 MHz, "Z100") is a commercial radio station in Missoula, Montana. The station is owned by Townsquare Media and licensed to Townsquare License, LLC. KZOQ airs a classic rock music format. Featuring The Brian and Chris Show in the mornings with Brian Lee and Chris Wolfe. Z100 is Missoulas heritage rock station being one of the big four, the first four commercial FM stations to come to Missoula.  Z100 played album rock with a 50/50 mix of classic and current rock music.  For a time in the 1990s Z100's music mix leaned towards alternative and pop rocks giving it a Modern Adult sound at times.  With 96.3 The blaze coming in, filling the shoes for New rock, Z100 became classic rock on the same day the Blaze premiered.  For years Z100 aired the popular Craig & Al morning show before it moved to KYSS FM in 2004,

External links

Classic rock radio stations in the United States
ZOQ
Radio stations established in 1979
1979 establishments in Montana
Townsquare Media radio stations